Hjernerystelsesforeningen (English: Danish Concussion Association) is a Danish non-profit and non-governmental organization that strives to help people suffering from concussion and post-concussive syndrome, as well as working towards better understanding and a cure. Founded in 2013, the volunteers and staff nationwide have helped to provide support and resources to those affected.

Cooperations 
In 2016 they partnered with Spillerforeningen, Håndboldspillerforeningen and Danske Elitesportsudøveres Forening to help elite athletes suffering from concussion.

In 2017 they partnered with Danmarks Ishockey Union and Dansk Håndbold Forbund, in an effort to reduced the concussion injuries in Danish ice hockey and team handball. This partnership was criticised by the players organizations for being to shallow.

In the media 
The organization is frequently used in the Danish media, in concussion-related topics, and has been featured in the written press extensively, as well as in television-media. Topics range from helping the patients, helping next of kin, affecting the politicians, and engaging in concussions in sport.

Chairmen

References

External links 
 Hjernerystelsesforeningens official website
 Hjernerystelsesforeningens Facebook-site

Disability organizations based in Denmark
Organizations based in Copenhagen
2013 establishments in Denmark